A Black Man's Soul is an instrumental album by musician Ike Turner & the Kings of Rhythm released by Pompeii Records in 1969.

Recording and release 
A Black Man's Soul contains songs written by Ike Turner, fellow St. Louis musician Oliver Sain and some others including Rufus Thomas. The album was recorded during Turner's free time while he was touring with then wife Tina Turner as part of the Ike & Tina Turner Revue. All tracks were recorded at various studios in the U.S. between tour dates. The album was released on the Dallas-based label Pompeii in April 1969. It was distributed by London Records in the Netherlands.

A Black Man's Soul exposed a side of Turner's music not as popular with his audiences of the time. While Ike & Tina Turner's repertoire up to that point relied heavily on vocal harmonies and popular soul influences, these tracks reflected a more traditional and simple funk popularized by acts such as Charles Wright & the Watts 103rd Street Rhythm Band, Baby Huey, The Bar-Kays and Brother Jack McDuff among others.

One single was released, "Thinking Black" / "Black Angel" (ST-100), distributed by Sterling Award Records in association with Pompeii Records.

Awards and nominations 
A Black Man's Soul was nominated for Best R&B Instrumental Performance at the 12th Annual Grammy Awards.

Reissues 
A Black Man's Soul was released as Funky Mule (1975) by DJM Records in the UK and as Ike Turner & His Kings of Rhythm by Bellaphon Records in Germany. In 2003, the album was reissued on CD with four bonus tracks, including three with vocals from Tina Turner. It was digitally remastered and included in the 3-CD compilation The Complete Pompeii Recordings 1968-1969 released from Goldenlane Records in 2016.

Sampling
Los Angeles hip-hop group Jurassic 5 sampled "Getting Nasty" in the track "Concrete Schoolyard" on their self-titled EP.

Track listing 
All tracks composed by Ike Turner; except where indicated.

Personnel 
Ike Turner - guitar, piano
The Kings of Rhythm
Jesse Knight - guitar
Mack Johnson - drums
Tommy "Teasky" Tribble - percussion
Fred Sample, Billy Preston - piano
Washee - saxophone
Jesse Heron - trombone
Technical
Loring Eutemey - cover design

References

External links
 Ike Turner & The Kings Of Rhythm – A Black Man's Soul
 A Black Man's Soul: The Ike Turner Diaries CD

1969 albums
Ike Turner albums
Instrumental albums
Albums produced by Ike Turner
Albums produced by Tina Turner
Funk albums by American artists
London Records albums